Elizabeth Bradley (1922–2000) was an English actress.

Elizabeth Bradley may also refer to:
Elizabeth Bradley (drama professor) (born 1955), Canadian theatre academic, chair of drama at New York University
Elizabeth Bradley (mathematician and rower) (born 1961), professor at University of Colorado and competitor in 1988 Olympics
Elizabeth H. Bradley (born 1962), American political scientist and president of Vassar College